Maurice William Elias (December 23, 1936September 9, 2016), known professionally as James Stacy, was an American film and television actor. He is perhaps best known for starring in the late 1960s TV western Lancer.

In 1973, Stacy was hit by a drunk driver while driving his motorcycle, resulting in the amputation of his left leg and arm and the death of his girlfriend. He returned to acting in 1975 before retiring in 1992.

Early life 
Stacy was born Maurice William Elias on December 23, 1936, in Los Angeles to an Ulster-Scots waitress and a Lebanese-American bookmaker.

Career
Stacy made his film debut in Sayonara in 1957, and his television debut in Highway Patrol. He had a recurring role as "Fred" in The Adventures of Ozzie and Harriet from 1958 to 1963. During the 1960s he made guest appearances in television shows, including 5 episodes of Gunsmoke, Hazel, The Donna Reed Show, Have Gun - Will Travel, Combat!, and Perry Mason in the 1964 episode "The Case of the Simple Simon" and the series finale "The Case of the Final Fade-out" in 1966.

Stacy is perhaps best remembered as a star of the western series Lancer, along with Andrew Duggan, Wayne Maunder, and Paul Brinegar. Lancer aired on CBS from 1968 to 1970. Stacy played the character "Johnny Madrid Lancer", a former gunslinger, the son of Duggan's character, Murdoch Lancer. Stacy also acted in several motion pictures from the 1950s through the 1970s, including a minor part in the musical South Pacific.

Motorcycle accident
On September 27, 1973, Stacy was taking Claire Cox for a ride on his motorcycle in the Hollywood Hills when a drunken driver struck them. As a result of the accident, Cox was killed and Stacy lost his left arm and leg. Stacy's ex-wife, actress and singer Connie Stevens, organized a 1974 celebrity gala to raise money for his expenses. The gala, whose attendees included Frank Sinatra and Barbra Streisand, raised $118,000 ($ million today) for his expenses. In 1976, he won a $1.9 million lawsuit ($ million today) against the bar that had served the drunk driver.

Comeback
After his recovery, Stacy appeared in roles created to accommodate his disability. His comeback film was the 1975 Kirk Douglas Western Posse, in which he was cast as newspaper editor Harold Hellman, a part Douglas had written for him. In 1977, he starred in the TV movie Just a Little Inconvenience, playing a double-amputee Vietnam veteran. The role earned him his first Primetime Emmy Award nomination for Outstanding Lead Actor in a Drama or Comedy Special. In 1980, Stacy starred in and produced the TV movie My Kidnapper, My Love. His brother, Louie Elias, a character actor and stuntman, wrote the screenplay, based on the novel by Oscar Saul, to accommodate Stacy's disability. Elias was also the associate producer. Stacy also played Ed, the Bartender in the film Something Wicked This Way Comes.

Other television appearances included Hotel, Cagney & Lacey (for which he was nominated for a second Primetime Emmy Award for Outstanding Guest Performer in a Drama Series), and Highway to Heaven. His last TV role was in five 1990 episodes of the cop series Wiseguy, playing Ed Rogosheske.

Personal life

Marriages 
Stacy was married twice. He married actress and singer Connie Stevens on October 12, 1963, in Hollywood. They were divorced in November 1966. Stacy's second marriage was to actress Kim Darby in 1968. They had a daughter, Heather, and divorced in 1969.

Arrest and conviction 
In November 1995, Stacy pleaded no contest to a charge of molesting an 11-year-old girl. On December 7, 1995, he failed to appear for sentencing in Ventura County Superior Court and was arrested the next day in a Honolulu, Hawaii hospital after having fled California. He attempted suicide by jumping off a cliff. After recovering, Stacy waived extradition and returned to California. On March 5, 1996, he received a six-year prison sentence. The prosecutor in the case initially said she believed Stacy might have been eligible for probation for the molestation, but his post-arrest behavior, coupled with two arrests in June 1995 for prowling at the homes of other girls, led her to seek a prison sentence. He served his sentence at the California Institution for Men in Chino, California.

Death 
On September 9, 2016, Stacy died of anaphylactic shock in Ventura, California after being administered an antibiotic injection at the office of Dr. Cedric Emery. He was 79 years old.

Portrayal
Stacy is portrayed by Timothy Olyphant in the 2019 Quentin Tarantino film Once Upon a Time in Hollywood starring Leonardo DiCaprio and Brad Pitt.

Filmography

References

External links
 
 
 James Stacy Web Ring 
 James Stacy Biography (aka Maurice William Elias)

1936 births
2016 deaths
20th-century American male actors
American amputees
American male film actors
American male television actors
American people convicted of child sexual abuse
American people of Lebanese descent
American people of Scottish descent
Deaths from anaphylaxis
Male actors from Los Angeles
Male Western (genre) film actors
Prisoners and detainees of California
Respiratory disease deaths in California
Television producers from California
Western (genre) television actors